The Presidente Prudente Formation is a geological formation of the Bauru Group in the Paraná Basin, located in Brazil whose strata date back to the Late Campanian to Early Maastrichtian. Since at least 1953, parts of this formation, such as the type locality of Austroposeidon, have been lost to urban development.

Paleofauna

Crocodyliformes

Turtles

Dinosaurs

References 

Geologic formations of Brazil
Upper Cretaceous Series of South America
Cretaceous Brazil
Campanian Stage
Maastrichtian Stage of South America
Fossiliferous stratigraphic units of South America
Paleontology in Brazil
Sandstone formations
Formations